The 2011 AAMI Classic will take place between 12–15 January 2011, at the Kooyong Stadium in Melbourne, Australia. Fernando Verdasco was the defending champion, but lost in the first round to Gaël Monfils.  Lleyton Hewitt won in the final against Gaël Monfils 7–5, 6–3.

Seeds

Draw

Main draw

Play-offs

Notes
After the second day of matches was canceled due to rain, the first-round match between Tsonga and Melzer was converted to a single 'pro set' (first to eight games, by a margin of two) instead of the standard best of three, in order to save time and enable the second-round matches to be played later on the same day. (Melzer won 8-6).

The play-offs were also delayed and ultimately cancelled due to rain delays.

References

External links
Official AAMI Classic website

Kooyong Classic
AAMI Classic